Bürglen is a municipality in the canton of Uri in Switzerland.

History
Bürglen is first mentioned in 857 as Burgilla.  In 1240 it was mentioned as Burgelon.

Geography

Of this area, 51.4% is used for agricultural purposes, while 19.9% is forested. Of the rest of the land, 2.1% is settled (buildings or roads) and the remainder (26.6%) is non-productive (rivers, glaciers or mountains). , 15.0% of the total land area was heavily forested, while 1.2% is covered in small trees and shrubbery. Of the agricultural land, 0.2% is used for farming or pastures, while 13.2% is used for orchards or vine crops and 38.1% is used for alpine pastures. Of the settled areas, 1.0% is covered with buildings, 0.2% is industrial, and 0.9% is transportation infrastructure. Of the unproductive areas, 0.1% is unproductive standing water (ponds or lakes), 0.8% is unproductive flowing water (rivers), 12.5% is too rocky for vegetation,  and 13.2% is other unproductive land.

The municipality is located south east of Altdorf at the entrance of the Schächental valley. The village is at the start of the road over the pass Klausenpass, which connects Uri and Glarus.

Demographics
, 3.6% of the population was made up of foreign nationals. Over the last 10 years the population has grown at a rate of 4%. Most of the population speaks German  (96.7%), with Serbo-Croatian being second most common ( 1.0%) and Albanian being third ( 0.5%).   the gender distribution of the population was 51.9% male and 48.1% female.

The entire Swiss population is generally well educated.  In Bürglen about 61.2% of the population (between age 25-64) have completed either non-mandatory upper secondary education or additional higher education (either university or a Fachhochschule).

Bürglen has an unemployment rate of 0.49%.  , there were 284 people employed in the primary economic sector and about 126 businesses involved in this sector.  727 people are employed in the secondary sector and there are 35 businesses in this sector.  733 people are employed in the tertiary sector, with 79 businesses in this sector.

The historical population is given in the following table:

Notable residents

According to legend, this village is the home of William Tell.
Priest Wendelin Bucheli of Bürglen became well known within Switzerland in February 2015 for blessing a lesbian couple, in the aftermath of which the bishop of Chur questioned his status as a priest. Residents and people throughout the country supported his action.

References

External links

Official website 

Municipalities of the canton of Uri